Daniel Shaquille Jabari Phillips (born 18 January 2001) is a professional footballer who plays as a midfielder for St Johnstone. Phillips, who was born in England, plays for the Trinidad and Tobago national team. He has previously played for Watford, Hemel Hempstead Town and Gillingham.

Early and personal life 
Born in Enfield, Phillips attended Enfield Grammar School. He is a second cousin of former footballer and fellow Trinidad and Tobago international Ian Cox.

Career

Watford
Phillips played in the Chelsea academy from the under-10 to under-14 age-groups. Following his release by Chelsea he joined Watford after a week-long trial. He signed a one-year professional contract in May 2019 at the end of his scholarship, with the option of a further year. In August 2019 Phillips joined National League South side Hemel Hempstead Town on loan until January 2020, but damaged ankle ligaments early in the season and was out for six months. 

Phillips signed a one-year contract extension in June 2020. He made his Watford debut against Middlesbrough on 11 September as an 89th minute substitute for Domingos Quina. The match was Watford's first game in the Championship following relegation from the Premier League. He made his first club start on 15 September against Oxford United in the EFL Cup.

In July 2021, Phillips joined Gillingham on a season-long loan. He made his debut in a 1–1 draw at home to Lincoln City on 7 August 2021. Phillips was released by Watford at the end of the 2021–22 season.

St Johnstone
Phillips signed a two-year contract with Scottish Premiership club St Johnstone in August 2022.

International career
Phillips is of Trinidadian descent and first expressed an interest in representing Trinidad and Tobago in 2019. 

In March 2021, Phillips was called up by Trinidad and Tobago for the first time. He was named in their provisional squad for World Cup qualifiers later that month against Guyana and Puerto Rico. He made his debut on 25 March 2021 against Guyana.

Career statistics

Club

References

2001 births
Living people
Footballers from the London Borough of Enfield
Citizens of Trinidad and Tobago through descent
Trinidad and Tobago footballers
Trinidad and Tobago international footballers
English footballers
English sportspeople of Trinidad and Tobago descent
Association football midfielders
Chelsea F.C. players
Watford F.C. players
Hemel Hempstead Town F.C. players
Gillingham F.C. players
English Football League players
St Johnstone F.C. players
Scottish Professional Football League players